"Elevate" is a song by Canadian rapper Drake from his album, Scorpion (2018), The song features additional uncredited vocals by French Montana, the song has reached the top 20 in Canada and the United States.

Charts

Certifications

References

2018 songs
Drake (musician) songs
Songs written by Drake (musician)
Songs written by PartyNextDoor
Trap music songs